By Inheritance is the third studio album by Danish thrash metal band Artillery. It was released in 1990 via Roadrunner Records. It was Artillery's last album before they disbanded in 1991 and the release of their next album, B.A.C.K., in 1999. By Inheritance is considered by many thrash metal fans as a classic in the genre.

Track listing

Credits
Flemming Rønsdorf - vocals
Morten Stützer - guitar
Michael Stützer - guitar
Peter Thorslund - bass
Carsten Nielsen - drums

References

1990 albums
Artillery (band) albums
Roadrunner Records albums
Albums produced by Flemming Rasmussen